Sam Morris (12 February 1930 – 20 December 2014) was a British footballer who played as a wing half in the Football League for Chester.

References

1930 births
2014 deaths
Chester City F.C. players
Association football wing halves
English Football League players
Footballers from Warrington
English footballers